Stéphanie Possamaï (born 30 July 1980, in Bordeaux) is a French judoka.

Possamaï won a bronze medal in the -78 kg category at the 2008 Summer Olympics.

References

External links
 

Living people
French female judoka
Judoka at the 2008 Summer Olympics
Olympic judoka of France
Olympic bronze medalists for France
Sportspeople from Bordeaux
1980 births
Olympic medalists in judo
Medalists at the 2008 Summer Olympics
Universiade medalists in judo
Mediterranean Games silver medalists for France
Mediterranean Games medalists in judo
Competitors at the 2005 Mediterranean Games
Universiade bronze medalists for France
Medalists at the 2003 Summer Universiade
20th-century French women
21st-century French women